State Highway 320 (SH 320) is a rather short, Texas state highway that runs from SH 7 west of Marlin south to Zabcikville.  This route was designated on October 24, 1939.

Route description
SH 320 begins at a junction with SH 53.  It heads northeast from this junction to an intersection with Farm to Market Road 3369.  The highway continues to the northeast to an intersection with Farm to Market Road 431.  Heading towards the northeast, the highway continues to a junction with US 77.  The highway continues to the northeast to an intersection with Farm to Market Road 2027 in Lott.  SH 320 reaches its northern terminus at Farm to Market Road 2904.

Junction list

References

320
Transportation in Bell County, Texas
Transportation in Falls County, Texas